Huang Dongjie (born December 22, 1981 in Harbin) is a Chinese team handball player. Playing on the Chinese national team, she competed at the 2008 Summer Olympics in Beijing, where China placed sixth.

References

External links 
 
 
 

1981 births
Living people
Olympic handball players of China
Chinese female handball players
Handball players at the 2008 Summer Olympics
Handball players from Harbin